Pillar coral (Dendrogyra cylindrus) is a hard coral (order Scleractinia) found in the western Atlantic Ocean and the Caribbean Sea. It is the only species in the monotypic genus Dendrogyra. It is a digitate coral -that is, it resembles fingers (Latin digites) or a cluster of cigars, growing up from the sea floor without any secondary branching. It is large and can grow on both flat and sloping surfaces at depths down to 20 m (65 ft). It is one of the few types of hard coral in which the polyps can commonly be seen feeding during the day.

Description

Pillar coral forms an encrusted base from which grow vertical cylindrical, round-ended columns. The skeleton of the coral is not usually visible because the polyps are typically extended during the daytime, unlike most other coral species. The mass of undulating tentacles gives the coral a furry appearance. This coral is usually some shade of beige or brown.

Distribution and habitat
Pillar corals are found in the warmer parts of the western Atlantic Ocean and the Caribbean Sea. Within its range, D. cylindrus is common in some places, but rare in other seemingly suitable locations. Some of the islands in the Bahamas have plentiful numbers of colonies as does the north coast of Jamaica. It used to be common on the reefs off the coast of Florida but has suffered from over-collection there. It seems to be absent from Bermuda and the coasts of Panama and Colombia.

Biology
Pillar coral is a zooxanthellate species, with symbiotic dinoflagellate algae living within the tissues. In sunlight these undergo photosynthesis and most of the organic compounds they produce are transferred to their host, while they make use of the coral's nitrogenous wastes. These algae give the coral its brownish colour and restrict it to living in shallow water into which the sunlight can penetrate.

Pillar coral is a slow-growing, long-lived species. A number of columns grow up from a basal plate; if the whole colony is dislodged and topples over, new cylindrical pillars can grow vertically from the fallen coral. Some specimens have been found where this has happened more than once, and the history of the colony can be deduced from its shape. If a pillar gets detached and becomes lodged in a suitable position, it can continue to live, sending up new pillars from the base and other parts of the column.

Each pillar coral clonal colony is either male or female. Sexual reproduction takes place with gametes being released into the water column where fertilisation takes place. The larvae that develop from the eggs are planktonic and drift with the currents before settling on the seabed to found new colonies.

Status
The IUCN Red List of Threatened Species lists pillar coral as being "Critically Endangered". This is because recruitment and survival rates of juveniles is low and this coral is particularly susceptible to both bleaching and white plague disease. It is resistant to strong wave action but can be wrecked by hurricanes and tropical storms. However, broken fragments regenerate well. Some of the localities in which it is found are in marine parks and in these it should be safe from human disturbance.  In addition, the advent of stony coral tissue loss disease in Florida and the Caribbean is causing local extinctions and may have species-level effects on this species as it is infected at an early stage of the disease progression.

Gallery

References

External links
 NOAA Fisheries Species Directory - Pillar Coral
 Brief video of small specimen in Florida Keys

Meandrinidae

Corals described in 1834
ESA threatened species
Taxa named by Christian Gottfried Ehrenberg